Mark Gerard Connolly (born 16 December 1991) is an Irish footballer who plays for Derry City. He has previously played for Bolton Wanderers, St Johnstone, Macclesfield Town, Crawley Town, Kilmarnock, Dundee United, Dunfermline Athletic and Dundalk. Connolly has also represented the Republic of Ireland at under-21 level.

Club career

Bolton Wanderers
Connolly was signed from Wolverhampton Wanderers by Bolton Wanderers on the summer transfer deadline in 2009 after the clubs agreed a £1,000,000 fee. Wolves later reported Bolton and their assistant manager Chris Evans, a former academy director at Wolves, for an illegal approach for the player. Connolly later stated he was unaware of the transfer fee Bolton had paid.

On the January transfer dealine day of 2010, Connolly signed on loan for St Johnstone until the end of the season. He made his debut on 27 March 2010 in the loss to Hamilton Academical.

During the 2011–12 season, Connolly was captain of Bolton Wanderers's reserve team and was on the substitutes bench for the first team in their League Cup win against Macclesfield Town and he then joined Macclesfield on 24 February 2012, on a months loan, making his debut the following day in their 1–1 draw at Oxford United.

On 15 May 2012, Connolly confirmed on his Twitter account that he had left Bolton. This was followed by confirmation from the club that Connolly was one of twelve players released following the club's relegation to the Championship.

Crawley Town
On 9 July 2012, Crawley Town announced that Connolly had signed for them on a two-year contract. Connolly later stated he joined Crawley because he wanted the chance to play first team football. Connolly made his debut on 14 August, starting in a League Cup match as a right-back against Championship side Millwall which ended 2–2, with Crawley winning 4–1 on penalties. He then made his league debut for Crawley, in the opening game of the season, in a 3–0 win over Scunthorpe United. In late August 2012, Connolly was part of the Crawley team which successfully defeated Bolton in the League Cup thanks to a last minute goal by Nicky Ajose. In November 2012, after an earlier spell out of the side, Connolly spoke of his enjoyment at getting back in the team and playing regular first team games. On 1 January 2013, he scored his first Crawley Town goal in the 5th minute, in a 3–0 win over Colchester United. In a home match against Brentford on 26 February 2013, Connolly gave away a penalty and received a red card after 50 seconds, with Crawley going on to lose 2–1. He returned after being on the bench for five matches against Crewe on 26 March 2013. Connolly's second goal for the club came on 20 April 2013, in a 2–1 loss against Oldham Athletic. In his first season at Crawley Town, Connolly scored twice in 35 appearances for the club.

In his second season, Connolly remained at the club after being linked with a move to Championship clubs following his performances during the previous season. He spent most of the first half of the season on the bench before regaining his first team place. Connolly then scored his first goal of the season, with a header, in a 1–0 win over Notts County on 29 December 2013. He went on to make 40 appearances in all competitions. Despite the club starting negotiations over a new contract, Connolly was among 11 players released at the end of the 2013–14 season.

Kilmarnock
Connolly signed a three-year contract with Scottish club Kilmarnock in July 2014. He made his debut on 9 August 2014, in a 1–1 draw with Dundee Connolly then scored his first Kilmarnock goal from a header and earlier set up a goal for Robbie Muirhead, in a 2–1 win over St Mirren A few weeks later on 3 October 2014, he scored his second goal of the season, in a 2–0 win over Dundee United. On 22 February 2015, Connolly was injured during Kilmarnock's 3–3 draw against Inverness Caledonian Thistle and it was later confirmed he had broken his collarbone with the injury expected to keep him out for the remainder of the season. He returned from injury earlier than expected against Motherwell on 8 May 2015.

Ahead of the 2015–16 season Connolly was named as captain of Kilmarnock, replacing Manuel Pascali who had left the club earlier in the summer. On 23 May 2016, he had his contract cancelled.

Return to Crawley Town
On 2 July 2016, Connolly re-joined Crawley Town preceding his contract expiry from Kilmarnock. On 6 August 2016, he made his Crawley return in a 1–0 victory against Wycombe Wanderers, playing the full 90 minutes. On 1 October 2016, Connolly scored the winner in Crawley's 1–0 victory over Blackpool, netting in the 69th minute.

Dundee United
On 31 January 2019, Connolly signed for Dundee United of the Scottish Championship for an undisclosed fee, on a two-and-a-half-year contract. He scored his first goal for the club on 4 January 2020, the only goal of their away match against Queen of the South, in what was his first appearance in the starting lineup since the previous August. He was part of the United team that were 14 points clear at the top of the Championship table when the 2019-20 season was curtailed due to the COVID-19 pandemic; they were subsequently declared champions and promoted to the Premiership. In August 2020 he extended his contract with the club until 2023. The following month, he was charged with "not acting in the best interests of football" and breaching COVID regulations, when he allegedly refused to wear a face mask in a taxi. He was subsequently given a suspended two-match ban at a Scottish Football Association disciplinary hearing. In May 2021, Connolly snapped his cruciate ligament in a Premiership match against Motherwell, and was expected to be out injured for several months.

Connolly was loaned to Dunfermline Athletic in September 2021. He departed the club in January 2022 after playing every minute of his 14 appearances for the club, scoring 1 goal.

On 17 January 2022, Connolly returned to his home country, signing for League of Ireland Premier Division club Dundalk on a six month loan deal. Dundalk confirmed on 22 July 2022 that Connolly had been recalled by Dundee United following his loan spell.

Derry City
After ending his loan spell at Dundalk, Dundee United sold Connolly to Derry City on 28 July 2022 for an undisclosed fee.

Career statistics

References

External links

Republic of Ireland U17 profile at Soccer Scene
Republic of Ireland U19 profile at Soccer Scene

1991 births
Living people
Association footballers from County Monaghan
Republic of Ireland association footballers
Republic of Ireland under-21 international footballers
Association football defenders
Monaghan United F.C. players
Wolverhampton Wanderers F.C. players
Bolton Wanderers F.C. players
St Johnstone F.C. players
Macclesfield Town F.C. players
Crawley Town F.C. players
Scottish Premier League players
English Football League players
Kilmarnock F.C. players
Scottish Professional Football League players
Dundee United F.C. players
Dunfermline Athletic F.C. players
Dundalk F.C. players
League of Ireland players
Derry City F.C. players